German submarine U-1234 was a Type IXC/40 U-boat of Nazi Germany's Kriegsmarine built during World War II for service in the Battle of the Atlantic. U-1234 was unusual for having sunk twice, once by accident and once as part of the great destruction of the remaining Kriegsmarine in the days before the surrender.

Design
German Type IXC/40 submarines were slightly larger than the original Type IXCs. U-1234 had a displacement of  when at the surface and  while submerged. She had two shafts and two  propellers.

U-1234 was fitted with six  torpedo tubes (four fitted at the bow and two at the stern), 22 torpedoes, one  SK C/32 naval gun, 180 rounds, and a  Flak M42 as well as two twin  C/30 anti-aircraft guns. The boat had a complement of forty-eight.

Service history
U-1234 was delayed in her construction and did not reach full service status until almost a year after her construction began, a very long time for a U-boat. She was given to Kapitänleutnant Helmut Thurmann to command, and he began her process of mechanical testing and operational training in the Baltic Sea. Just under a month after her commissioning, whilst cruising off Gdynia on the night of 14/15 May, she was struck on the broadside by the steam tug Anton. The boat was holed and rapidly began to sink, slipping below the waves leaving her commander and most of her crew bobbing in the sea. Thirteen crew never reached the shore or the rescue boats and went down with their ship.

On 17 October 1944, the boat was raised by divers and lifting equipment from the sea bed, and repaired and recommissioned into the Kriegsmarine. Such severe damage had been done to her vital systems however that she was no longer suitable for full combat duty, and was seconded to a training flotilla, where she remained to the end of the war. On 5 May 1945 her crew took her into the Hörup Haff off Flensburg and scuttled her to keep her from falling into Allied hands as their ground forces approached the port.

References

Bibliography

External links
 

Ships built in Hamburg
German Type IX submarines
U-boat accidents
U-boats commissioned in 1943
U-boats sunk in 1944
World War II shipwrecks in the Baltic Sea
World War II submarines of Germany
1943 ships
U-boats sunk in collisions
Maritime incidents in May 1944
Maritime incidents in May 1945
Operation Regenbogen (U-boat)